Lachlan, an electoral district of the Legislative Assembly in the Australian state of New South Wales, had four incarnations, from 1859 to 1880, from 1894 to 1920, from 1927 to 1950 and from 1981 to 2007.


Election results

Elections in the 2000s

2003

Elections in the 1990s

1999

1995

1991

Elections in the 1980s

1988

1984

1981

1950 - 1981

Elections in the 1940s

1947

1944

1943 by-election

1941

Elections in the 1930s

1938

1935

1932

1930

Elections in the 1920s

1927

1920 - 1927

Elections in the 1910s

1917

1913

1910

Elections in the 1900s

1907

1904

1901

Elections in the 1890s

1898

1896 by-election

1895

1894

1880 - 1894

Elections in the 1870s

1879 by-election

1877

1875

1872

Elections in the 1860s

1869

1864

1860

Elections in the 1850s

1859

Notes

References

New South Wales state electoral results by district